Anselme Gaëtan Desmarest (6 March 1784 – 4 June 1838) was a French zoologist and author. He was the son of Nicolas Desmarest and father of Eugène Anselme Sébastien Léon Desmarest. He was elected to the American Philosophical Society in 1819 and to the Académie Nationale de Médecine in 1820.

The brown algae Desmarestia is named in honour of Desmarest, as well as the family (Desmarestiaceae) — and in turn, the order (Desmarestiales) — of which the genus is the type species.

References

French zoologists
French taxonomists
1784 births
1838 deaths
French carcinologists
French mammalogists
French ornithologists
18th-century French zoologists
19th-century French zoologists